Cao Dong (born 10 November 1997) is a Chinese footballer who currently plays for Chinese Super League side Quanzhou Yassin, on loan from Chongqing Liangjiang.

Club career
Cao Dong was promoted to Chinese Super League side Chongqing Dangdai Lifan's first team squad in 2018. On 3 March 2018, he made his senior debut in a 1–0 home win against Beijing Renhe, coming on as a substitute for Wu Qing in the 67th minute.

Career statistics
.

References

External links
 

1997 births
Living people
Chinese footballers
People from Longnan
Footballers from Gansu
Chongqing Liangjiang Athletic F.C. players
Chinese Super League players
Association football midfielders